Clam Lake is an unincorporated, census-designated place in the town of Gordon in Ashland County, Wisconsin, United States. It is located on Wisconsin Highway 77 near County Highway GG. The entire area lies within the Chequamegon National Forest, an 860,000 acre area spread across northern Wisconsin. As of the 2010 census, its population was 37.

Situated near the headwaters of the Chippewa Flowage, the area encompasses several smaller lakes that host prime Musky fishing.

Clam Lake is well known as the site of the reintroduction of elk in Wisconsin with a herd of 25 in 1995 by the University of Wisconsin–Stevens Point, which has grown to an estimated 180.

Clam Lake is the site of a U.S. Navy extremely low frequency (ELF) transmitter site, used to communicate with deeply submerged submarines. It was used between 1985 and 2004 but is now decommissioned.

Geography
Clam Lake is located at  (46.164, -90.902).

References

External links
Clam Lake, Wisconsin website

Census-designated places in Ashland County, Wisconsin
Census-designated places in Wisconsin